Chionodes histon is a moth in the family Gelechiidae. It is found in North America, where it has been recorded from British Columbia.

The larvae feed on Picea engelmannii and Picea sitchensis.

References

Chionodes
Moths described in 1999
Moths of North America